
Gmina Bytom Odrzański is an urban-rural gmina (administrative district) in Nowa Sól County, Lubusz Voivodeship, in western Poland.

Villages
Apart from the town of Bytom Odrzański, Gmina Bytom Odrzański contains the villages and settlements of Bodzów, Bonów, Bycz, Drogomil, Królikowice, Kropiwnik, Małaszowice, Popowo, Sobolice, Tarnów Bycki and Wierzbnica.

Neighbouring gminas
Gmina Bytom Odrzański is bordered by the gminas of Niegosławice, Nowa Sól, Nowe Miasteczko, Siedlisko and Żukowice.

Twin towns – sister cities

Gmina Bytom Odrzański is twinned with:
 Pößneck, Germany

References

Bytom Odrzanski
Nowa Sól County